S. Guptan Nair (1919 – 2006) was an Indian scholar, academic, critic and writer of Malayalam literature. Known for his literary works as well as for his oratorical skills, Nair was a prolific writer with over 35 books to his credit. He was a distinguished fellow of the Kerala Sahitya Akademi and a recipient of several honours including Kendra Sahitya Academy Award, Kerala Sahitya Akademi Award, Vayalar Award, Vallathol Award and Ezhuthachan Puraskaram, the last one being the highest literary award of the Government of Kerala.

Life sketch
S. Guptan Nair was born at Oachira, a temple town famous for Oachira Parabrahma Temple, near Kayamkulam in present dayKollam district of the south Indian state of Kerala on August 22, 1919 to Sankara Pillai, a known ayurvedic scholar and physician and his wife, Kali Amma. 
His early schooling was the local school in Kayamkulam after which he graduated with honours in Malayalam literature from Government Arts College, Thiruvananthapuram in 1941. In 1945, he joined the department of Malayalam of the University College Thiruvananthapuram as a lecturer  and before superannuating from service in 1978 as the head of the department of Malayalam of the University of Calicut, he served in many educational institutions across Kerala such as Brennen College, Thalassery; Maharaja's College, Ernakulam and Government Victoria College, Palakkad, as a University Grants Commission (UGC) professor. Later, he chaired the Kerala Sahithya Akademi and the Sahithya Pravarthaka Sahakarana Sangham (SPCS - Writers 'Cooperative Society). Besides, he served as the president of Kerala Sahitya Samithi, Margi, Vidhyabhyasa Sureksha Samithi and Shree Chithirathirunal Granthashala, as the assistant director of Kerala Bhasha Institute and was the editor of publications like Malayali, Grandhalokham and Vigyana Kairali. He was also involved with Education Protection Forum, a movement against student politics in the educational institutions in Kerala.

Guptan Nair was married to Bhagirathi Amma and the couple had three children, B. Lakshmi Kumari, M G Sasibhooshan, a historian and writer, and B. Sudha Kumari. Nair died in a private hospital in Thiruvananthapuram on February 6, 2006, succumbing to respiratory illnesses, at the age of 86.

Literary career 
Guptan Nair was considered by many as one of great critics of modern Malayalam literature. He dealt with complex literary topics in a simple style, found in books such as Isangalkkappuram, a literary study which received the Kerala Sahitya Akademi Award for Literary Criticism. Asthiyude Pookkal, Changampuzha Kaviyum Kavithayum, a study on the life and literature of Changampuzha Krishna Pillai is another of his notable works. Books such as Krantha Darsikal, Navamalika and Gadyam Pinnitta Vazhikal are counted among his major works. Apart from several essay anthologies and biographies, he also edited a dictionary, the N B S Concise English-Malayalam Dictionary of National Book Stall. His memoirs is titled Maanasasmarami. He was also instrumental in publishing a number of letters written by his friend and poet, G. Sankara Kurup as well as the writings of Kutti Kunju Thankachi, the 19th century writer and the daughter of Irayimman Thampi, which was edited and published by Guptan Nair under the title, Kuttikunju Thankachiyude Kruthikal in 1979.

Awards and honours 
The Kerala Sahitya Akademi instituted an annual award for literary criticism in 1966. the award for the second year was awarded to Guptan Nair, for his work, Isangalkkappuram. Nair received the Kendra Sahitya Akademi Award in 1983 and the Lalithambika Antharjanam Award in 1995. Kerala Sahitya Akademi honoured him with the distinguished fellowship in 1996 and two years later, he received the Vayalar Award. The Vallathol Award reached him in 1999 and the Government of Kerala awarded him their highest literary honour of the Ezhuthachan Puraskaram in 2005. He was also a recipient of G. Sankara Kurup Award, C. Achutha Menon Award, R. Sankaranarayanan Thampi Award, CV Raman Pillai Award and P. N. Panicker Award.

Guptan Nair Award 
A foundation in Nair's name, Prof. Guptan Nair Foundation, instituted an annual award, Guptan Nair Award in 2007 in his honour. The award carries  25,000 cash prize, a citation and a plaque and M. Leelavathi received the inaugural award. Ambalapuzha Rama Varma (2008), Sukumar Azhikode (2009), Hridayakumari (2010), G. Balakrishnan Nair (2011), O. N. V. Kurup (2012) Panmana Ramachandran Nair (2013), 
Puthussery Ramachandran (2015) and K. P. Sankaran (2019) are some of the recipients of the award.

Bibliography

Literary criticism and essays

Biographical works

Memoirs

Translations into other languages

Edited works

Writings on Guptan Nair

References

Further reading

External links
 

Malayalam-language writers
Writers from Kerala
Indian male essayists
Recipients of the Sahitya Akademi Award in Malayalam
Recipients of the Ezhuthachan Award
Academic staff of the University College Thiruvananthapuram
Academic staff of Government Victoria College, Palakkad
Academic staff of Maharaja's College, Ernakulam
Malayalam literary critics
Recipients of the Kerala Sahitya Akademi Award
2006 deaths
1919 births
People from Kollam district
20th-century Indian essayists
Indian literary critics